Valeri Vladimirovich Lenichko (born 6 March 1987) is a Belarusian former professional football player who also holds Russian citizenship.

Club career
He played in the Russian Football National League for FC Vityaz Podolsk in 2008.

External links
 
 

1987 births
Living people
Belarusian footballers
Russian footballers
Association football forwards
FC Vityaz Podolsk players
FC Petrotrest players
FC Vitebsk players